Obanta (originally Ogborogan) was the third king of the Ijebu kingdom who reigned in the 14th century in what is now Ogun State, Nigeria.

Obanta led a migration of people from Ile Ife to become the King in Ijebu Ode after his maternal grandfather, Oba (King) Olu Iwa, the first Awujale of Ijebu Ode, died. On arriving at Ijebu, the inhabitants welcomed him warmly, shouting "oba wa nita" meaning "the king is outside" in the Yoruba language. This is how Ogborogan became known as Obanta.

Obanta's descendants continued to hold the royal title of Awujale, though his power was limited by his chiefs and councils.

A statue in his honor stands in the city center of Ijebu Ode, near the neighborhood of Itale.

References

Nigerian traditional rulers
Ijebu Kingdom
Yoruba kings
14th-century monarchs in Africa
14th-century Nigerian people